Maintenon is a commune in the metropolitan area of Paris, France.

Maintenon, together with the neighbouring commune of Pierres, form an urban area of 7,075 inhabitants (2017).

History

Maintenon is known for its picturesque Château de Maintenon, first home to the family d’Angennes, Marquis de Maintenon, later home of Madame de Maintenon, morganatic second wife of King Louis XIV.

Another tourist attraction is the ruined aqueduct of Maintenon, built by Louis XIV to carry water from the Eure to the gardens of the Palace of Versailles.

Population

People
Françoise d'Aubigné, marquise de Maintenon
Françoise-Marie de Bourbon - youngest daughter of Madame de Montespan and Louis XIV, born here in 1677

Transportation

Maintenon is served by Maintenon station on the  fast regional rail line between Paris and Le Mans via Chartres.  Maintenon is connected to the Ile de France network of suburban trains which start at Rambouliet.

See also
Communes of the Eure-et-Loir department

References

Communes of Eure-et-Loir